Jacksonella is a genus of  dwarf spiders that was first described by Alfred Frank Millidge in 1951.  it contains only three species, found in Cyprus, Greece, and Korea: J. bidens, J. falconeri, and J. sexoculata.

See also
 List of Linyphiidae species (I–P)

References

Araneomorphae genera
Linyphiidae
Spiders of Asia